Flirting with Fate may refer to:

 Flirting with Fate (1916 film), a 1916 American film
 Flirting with Fate (1938 film), a 1938 American comedy film
 Flirting with Fate (novel), a 2012 novel